Hunky is an ethnic slur used in the United States to refer to immigrants from Central Europe. It originated in the coal regions of Pennsylvania and West Virginia, where immigrants from Central Europe (Hungarians (Magyar), Czechs, Slovaks, Rusyns, Ukrainians, Slovenes, Serbs, Croats) came from the Austro-Hungarian Empire to perform hard manual labor in the mines. They were called "hunkies" by the American public, which lumped them together into a category of Slavic immigrants, irrespective of their individual ethnic background. The term as an ethnic slur has fallen into disuse, but the term hunky and the public image associated with it has historic relevance in the perception of Slavic immigrants in the United States. There is some usage of the term in other forms; for example, in regions of Pennsylvania, any mill worker may sometimes be referred to as a mill hunky.

History
The terms hunky and bohunk can be applied to various Slavic and Hungarian immigrants who moved to America from the Austro-Hungarian Empire. The immigrants came en masse prior to the turn of the twentieth century (starting around 1880) seeking opportunity and religious freedom. The Hunkies' image was a departure from Hungarian prestige that peaked around Lajos Kossuth's visit in 1851–1852, aka Triumphal Tour.

Image
Slavic immigrants settled in highly industrial areas and shaped the culture of certain towns and cities. Native residents referred to them as hunkies, and in areas of Pennsylvania, Ohio, and West Virginia. Many Slavic-Americans do not identify with the term and take offense, whereas others are proud of their heritage and the culture their immigrant ancestors created and do not consider the term offensive.

In 1990, artist Luis Jimenez made a 15-foot fiberglass statue and named it "Hunky – Steel Worker", and the sculpture was chosen to be among the hallmarks of that year's Three Rivers Arts Festival in Pittsburgh. The title was protested, saying the word "Hunky" was a slur, and the protest was joined by local politicians. Jiminez said the title was meant to honor the history of low-wage laborers in Western Pennsylvania, but gave his approval to have the word "Hunky" sandblasted off, so the title became simply "Steel Worker".

In 2009, Hunky Blues – The American Dream, a film by Péter Forgács, premiered at the Museum of Modern Art, New York, and National Gallery, Washington, D.C. Forgács, a Hungarian filmmaker, composed the poetic documentary exploring the fate of the hundreds of thousands of Hungarian men and women who immigrated to the United States between 1890 and 1921. Forgács constructed the film from segments of early American cinema, found footage, photographs, and interviews. The film considers difficult moments of arrival, integration and assimilation, and the pursuit of the immigrants and their descendants toward achieving the American Dream.

References

Austrian-American history
Eastern Europeans in the United States
European American culture in West Virginia
European-American society
Czech-American culture in New York (state)
Czech-American culture in Ohio
Czech-American culture in Pennsylvania
Hungarian-American culture in New York (state)
Hungarian-American culture in Ohio
Hungarian-American culture in Pennsylvania
New York (state) culture
Pennsylvania culture
Polish-American culture in New York (state)
Polish-American culture in Ohio
Polish-American culture in Pennsylvania
Rusyn-American culture in New York (state)
Rusyn-American culture in Ohio
Rusyn-American culture in Pennsylvania
Rusyn-American culture in West Virginia
Slavic-American history
Slovak-American culture in New York (state)
Slovak-American culture in Ohio
Slovak-American culture in Pennsylvania
Working-class culture in the United States